Dave Alfred LaRock (born May 30, 1956) is an American politician from Virginia. A member of the Republican Party, LaRock is the member of the Virginia House of Delegates for the 33rd district.

Political career
LaRock defeated incumbent Delegate Joe T. May in the June 11, 2013 Republican primary. He then defeated Democrat Mary L. Costello Daniel and Libertarian Patrick Hagerty in the November 5, 2013 general election. He was reelected on November 3, 2015, defeating Democrat Chuck Hedges and Libertarian Mark Anderson, winning 60% of the vote, including every precinct in the district. In 2017, he was again reelected, defeating Democrat Tia Walbridge 55%-45%.

LaRock's legislative efforts have focused on Transportation, Educational Choice, Pro-Life, Religious liberty, and 2nd Amendment issues; other successful legislation includes greater accessibility of Naloxone and legislation of local interest.

LaRock voted against a bill to eliminate a law banning sexual intercourse before marriage in the 2020 legislative session. The bill passed 91–5 with bipartisan support in the house.

LaRock voted against Medicaid expansion, HB5001, in the 2018 legislative session. The bill passed 68–30 in the House of Delegates with bipartisan support.

Views on sexual orientation and gender identity
LaRock has come under fire multiple times for anti-LGBT, sexist, and transphobic statements. In a 2018 interview, LaRock called gay conversion therapy programs "beautiful" and refused to use transgender state delegate Danica Roem's pronouns. He has also opposed efforts in Virginia to provide employment and housing protections to LGBT people, saying that the state should not provide special rights or protections for "chosen sexual habits." In another 2018 interview, LaRock said he would find it "very disturbing" if a transgender person was able to teach a kindergarten class, believing that transgender people have a mental disorder and that they should not be put into "role-model positions" in schools.

In 2019, LaRock started a petition to remove gender identity from the proposed changes to the Loudoun County Public Schools Equal Opportunity Policy. Loudoun County School Board's policy states that it does not discriminate on the basis of race, ethnicity, medical conditions, sexual orientation, gender identity, and other characteristics. However, LaRock claimed that adding "gender identity" to the list would "endanger our children."

2020–21 United States election protests 

LaRock was one of three GOP delegates in Virginia that sent a letter to Vice President Pence asking him to postpone the final counting of electoral votes, which gave Joe Biden the win including Virginia's 13 electoral votes. The letter included two co-signers, Del. Mark Cole (R-Fauquier) and Del. Ronnie Campbell (R-Lexington), requesting “a stay of any designation of Presidential Electors from our state until such time as a comprehensive forensic audit of the November 3, 2020, election has taken place to determine the actual winner.” 

In the months after the 2020 Election, LaRock encouraged attendance at various freedom rallies, including one in Washington, D.C. on January 6, and raised concerns about the 2020 presidential election.

January 6th, 2021 
LaRock participated in the rally at the White House Ellipse and another "Freedom Rally" on January 6, 2021 calling the protest “an outstanding exercise of the right of the people peaceably to assemble, and to petition the government for a redress of grievances. There was no vandalism, trash was picked up, and many times the masses sang the National Anthem together.” 

He condemned the violence, but posted on social media  that the Trump-supporting mob had been infiltrated by “paid provocateurs,” and that there was credible doubt around the validity of Joe Biden’s victory in the 2020 presidential election. Days later, LaRock said, “I think some antifa people were there. It also seems clear that there were people there who were Trump supporters but were behaving in a manner that is unbecoming to the great majority of people who support Donald Trump.”

LaRock faces calls to resign from the Loudoun NAACP, Winchester Area NAACP, fellow lawmakers, and at least two Loudoun County county supervisors. On January 12, 2021, Virginia House Speaker Eileen Filler-Corn (D) on stripped LaRock and the two other Republican delegates — Mark Cole and Ronnie Campbell — of one committee assignment each.

Support for constituent charged with criminal conspiracy
LaRock expressed his support for his constituent Thomas Caldwell, who was charged with conspiracy for his role in allegedly conspiring to forcibly storm the U.S. Capitol. Prior to learning of Caldwell's arrest, LaRock said, "Tom is a wonderful man. He and Sharon have been very supportive of me. Tom has served our country in a long and distinguished career in the U.S. military. I think very highly of Tom and Sharon." 

According to the charges, Caldwell is alleged to have a leadership role within the Oath Keepers, a right wing militia force, and to have sent Facebook messages while storming the capitol such as "Proud boys scuffled with cops and drove them inside to hide. Breached the doors. One guy made it all the way to the house floor, another to Pelosi’s office. A good time" and "We need to do this at the local level. Lets storm the capitol in Ohio. Tell me when!". The charges furthermore state that Caldwell shared a YouTube video in which he motions to the U.S. Capitol Building and shouts "Every single [expletive beeped in original] in there is a traitor. Every single one!" Also in the criminal charges, the FBI quoted a message allegedly sent to Caldwell which read: “All members are in the tunnels under the capital. Seal them in turn on gas.”

Other controversies

Trespassing
October 6, 2022 GOP candidate Lance Allen was sponsoring a showing of controversial movie '2000 Mules' (claims made in the movie by Dinesh D'Souza have been debunked and led to lawsuits against the movie) in Staunton Virginia. Dave LaRock had planned to sponsor the movie in Frederick County, Virginia but the venue canceled. Allen said LaRock could let people know about his showing in Stauton, but LaRock presented it on Facebook and in emails as his showing, having people email RSVPs to him. After that controversy was uncovered, Allen told LaRock he was welcome to attend but would not be allowed to campaign because this was Allen's campaign event. LaRock challenged Allen that he would have to call law enforcement to stop him. LaRock arrived put up a campaign sign and introducing himself as candidate for Senate 1 seat. 
Taking LaRock at his word, Allen called local police. LaRock claimed to police he was a sponsor of the event along with the 'Frederick 2 A' organization, and/or he was an invited guest of Allen. LaRock told police he wasn't campaigning, then in front of police (recorded on their body cam) called out to people walking down the street, gave his name saying he was a candidate for the Senate 1 seat, and confirmed to them he was a Republican.  Allen did not have him arrested. Police advised LaRock to leave. The movie had already started inside the building by that point. It was not reported if LaRock left or tried to enter the movie.
It has been claimed LaRock staged most of it, wanting Allen to call police on him, hoping for sympathetic media attention. 
It did not get the  coverage he had hoped for.

More Controversies

Trespassing
A complaint was filed against David LaRock in Loudoun County General District Court on four misdemeanor charges, including trespassing and destroying a posted sign. The offenses occurred between Sept. 8, 2020, and Oct. 12, 2020, on a property in Hamilton, Virginia. A no trespass order was provided on Sept. 4, 2020, according to the complaint. The charges for trespassing and destroying a posted sign were dismissed by the trial judge, who found LaRock guilty on two counts of pulling down a fence. LaRock was ordered to pay a $25 fine for each conviction.

Over the weekend of July 30–31, 2022, LaRock was again accused of damaging that same neighbor's property. 

LaRock had previously been charged with trespassing and destruction of property in 2012 related to an illegal sign.

Racist language
LaRock drew condemnations on social media and from local officials for use of the term "colored" in a January 2021 letter on his campaign website. In the letter, LaRock said of Loudoun Supervisors and NAACP leaders that "rather than focusing on the business of Loudoun County and the needs of the colored community, they are wasting their time and taxpayer resources to attack me.” The letter was updated immediately to replace "colored" with minorities. LaRock said he did not realize that using “colored people” was racist until after he issued the statement.

Personal life 
LaRock is a general contractor, and resides in Hamilton, Virginia, with his wife Joanne and the youngest three of their seven children.

References

External links
 
 Campaign Website
 Official Profile on Virginia General Assembly website
2018 session legislation
2017 session legislation
2016 session legislation
 2015 session legislation
 2014 session legislation

Living people
Protesters in or near the January 6 United States Capitol attack
Republican Party members of the Virginia House of Delegates
American construction businesspeople
21st-century American politicians
1956 births
People from Hamilton, Virginia